Glen Finch (born 18 July 1947) is a Canadian former freestyle swimmer. He competed in two events at the 1968 Summer Olympics.

References

External links
 

1947 births
Living people
Canadian male freestyle swimmers
Olympic swimmers of Canada
Swimmers at the 1968 Summer Olympics
Swimmers from Winnipeg